Horiuchi is a Japanese surname. Notable people with the surname include:

Annick Horiuchi, French historian of mathematics
, Japanese ballet dancer and choreographer
Glenn Horiuchi (1955–2000), American jazz pianist, composer, and shamisen player
, Japanese photographer
, Japanese sport wrestler
, Japanese comedian
, Japanese voice actor
Lon Horiuchi (born 1954), American FBI sniper
, Japanese actor
Mika Horiuchi (born 1986), American musician
, Japanese politician
Noriko Horiuchi (ほりうち のりこ, born 1965), Japanese politician
Paul Horiuchi (1906–1999), Japanese-American painter and collagist
, Japanese rower
, Japanese pop and enka singer
, Japanese politician
, Imperial Japanese Navy officer 
, Japanese baseball player
, Japanese sport wrestler

See also
Horinouchi (disambiguation)

Japanese-language surnames
Surnames of Asian origin